The 24th Utah Senate District is located in Juab, Piute, Sanpete, Sevier, Tooele and Wayne Counties and includes Utah House Districts 1, 21, 67, 68, 69, 70 and 73. The current State Senator representing the 24th district is Ralph Okerlund, a Republican from Monroe who replaced Darin Peterson. Peterson opted not to pursue re-election in 2008 due to health concerns. Okerlund defeated Tobiah "Toby" Dillon (D) from Tooele City, and Benton L. Peterson (C) from Manti in the 2008 election.

Previous Utah State Senators (District 24)

Election results

2016 general election

2012 general election

2008 general election

2006 general election

See also

 Darin Peterson
 Utah Democratic Party
 Utah Republican Party
 Utah Senate

References

External links
 Utah Senate District Profiles
 Official Biography of Ralph Okerlund

24
Juab County, Utah
Piute County, Utah
Sanpete County, Utah
Sevier County, Utah
Tooele County, Utah
Wayne County, Utah